Marcel Risse (born 17 December 1989) is a German professional footballer who plays as an attacking midfielder for FC Viktoria Köln. He has played for Bayer Leverkusen, 1. FC Nürnberg, 1. FSV Mainz 05, and 1. FC Köln.

Club career

Bayer Leverkusen
Risse was born in Cologne. He played for Bayer Leverkusen II during the 2006–07 season where he played in only one match. During the 2007–08 season, he went on to make his first team debut. He went on to play in three matches that season. However, the following season, he went back to playing for the reserve team before moving on loan to 1. FC Nürnberg. He ended up scoring one goal in five matches for the reserve team in 2008–09 season.

1. FC Köln
In June 2013, Risse signed a contract with 1. FC Köln. He ended his first season with 11 goals in 31 matches. The following season, in 2014–15, Risse scored five goals in 31 matches. In the 2015–16 season, he scored three goals in 35 matches, while in the 2016–17 season he scored three goals in 15 matches.

On 28 April 2018, Risse played in Köln's 3–2 defeat to SC Freiburg, which confirmed his team's relegation to the 2. Bundesliga. In August 2020, it was announced that Risse would join 3. Liga club FC Viktoria Köln on a loan deal.

Viktoria Köln 
On 8 July 2021, it was reported that 1. FC Köln had terminated Risse's contract and that he would join Viktoria Köln on a permanent basis.

International career
Risse is a youth international for Germany, having played for both the under-19 and under-20 national teams.

Career statistics

1.Includes UEFA Cup/UEFA Europa League.
2.Includes Relegation/Promotion playoff.

References

External links

Living people
1989 births
Association football midfielders
German footballers
Germany youth international footballers
Bayer 04 Leverkusen players
Bayer 04 Leverkusen II players
1. FC Nürnberg players
1. FSV Mainz 05 players
1. FC Köln players
1. FSV Mainz 05 II players
FC Viktoria Köln players
Bundesliga players
2. Bundesliga players
Footballers from Cologne